goodtoknow Recipes is a monthly cooking magazine published by Time Inc. UK. It is edited by Matt Davis.

Early history
The magazine was launched in February 2010 following the success a website of the same name.

References

External links
 

Monthly magazines published in the United Kingdom
Magazines established in 2010
English-language magazines
Food and drink magazines